The 54th Guards Fighter Aviation Regiment ( (54 GIAP); Military Unit Number 06931) was an aviation regiment of the Soviet Air Forces during World War II and the Cold War, which became part of the Soviet Air Defense Forces and the Russian Air Force.

World War II 
The 237th Fighter Aviation Regiment began forming in May 1941. It began the war at Varėna outside Pskov in the Baltic Special Military District as part of the 57th Mixed Aviation Division. From August 1942 the regiment served in combat with the 220th Fighter Aviation Division. On 3 February 1943 the regiment became the 54th Guards Fighter Aviation Regiment and the division became the 1st Guards Fighter Aviation Division, mostly fighting as part of the 16th Air Army.

Cold War 
After the end of the war, the regiment received the Bell P-63 Kingcobra. It was based at Vaiņode in the Latvian Soviet Socialist Republic. The 54th Guards received the Mikoyan-Gurevich MiG-15 in 1950 and the Mikoyan-Gurevich MiG-17 in 1956. It became part of the Soviet Air Defense Forces' 27th Air Defense Corps after the 1st Guards Division headquarters disbanded in 1960. In 1967, the 54th Guards became one of the first regiments equipped with the Sukhoi Su-15 interceptor, and received the Su-15TM in the late 1970s. In 1987, the 54th Guards received the Sukhoi Su-27. By November 1990, according to CFE Treaty data, the regiment fielded 38 Su-27s.

Russian service 
In November 1992, under the command of Colonel Ye. A. Tikhomirov, the regiment was relocated to Savasleyka. On 1 September 2002, it was reorganized as the 3958th Air Base, part of the 4th Center for Combat Employment and Retraining of Personnel. On 26 March 2005, the honors of the 54th Guards were transferred to the 3958th, which became the 3958th Guards Air Base. In early 2011, the base became the Aviation Squadron of the State Center for Training of Aviation Personnel and Combat Testing after the 4th Center was redesignated.

Aircraft operated

Assignments
 220th Fighter Aviation Division, August 1942 - 2.43
 1st Guards Fighter Aviation Division, 2.43 - 1960
 27th Air Defence Corps, 1960-12.77
 1st Guards Fighter Aviation Division, 12.77 - 15.4.86
 27th Air Defense Corps, 4.86 - 1992
 148th Centre for Combat Employment and Retraining of Personnel PVO, 1992 - 2001
 4th Centre for Combat Employment and Retraining of Personnel, 2001 - 2002

Stations
Guryevsk, Kaliningrad Oblast, May 1945 - August 1945 [54 47 15N, 20 37 10E]
Vainode, Latvian SSR, 8.45 - 1992 [56 24 27N, 21 53 19E]
Savostleyka, Gorkiy Oblast, 1992 - present [55 26 32N, 42 18 35E]

References

Citations

Bibliography 
 
 
 
 

Fighter regiments of the Soviet Air Forces
Fighter regiments of the Soviet Air Defence Forces
Regiments of the Russian Air Forces
Fighter aviation regiments of the Soviet Union in World War II
Military units and formations established in 1943
Military units and formations disestablished in 2002